Adi tala (Sanskrit: ādi tālà , Kannada: ಆದಿ ತಾಳ, literally "primary rhythm" also spelled aadi taalam or adi talam) is the name of one of the most popular tala or rhythms used in Carnatic Music. Its full technical name according to the Carnatic Music's tala system is Chaturashra-naDe Chaturashra-jaati triputa taLa.

Structure
This tala has eight aksharas, each being 4 svaras long. Many kritis and around half of the varnams  are set to this tala.

Carnatic music
Carnatic music terminology